Dominick Casola (born August 17, 1987) is an American professional stock car racing driver who most recently competed in what is now the ARCA Menards Series in 2013. He drove in ARCA for a total of four seasons full or part-time. He also ran two races in the NASCAR Truck Series, and made one attempt in the Nationwide Series (now Xfinity) in 2008.

Racing career
Casola started out racing in local Saturday night short track races, winning races and championships along the way. He eventually reached the Hooters X-1R Pro Cup Series, which he competed in part-time for a single season in 2006 (in his family's No. 02 car). He could not get behind the wheel of a stock car until age seventeen because of New Jersey state regulations. Despite this, he worked at sending resumes to many ARCA and NASCAR teams.

He got a chance to compete in ARCA full-time and for rookie of the year in 2007, driving the No. 1 Ford for Andy Belmont's team and sponsored by his family's business A. Casola Farms. He only missed one race that season, the season-opener at Daytona, with his car owner Belmont in the car for that race (which he failed to qualify for), presumably because Casola had never competed on a plate track before meaning he would not be approved to race. Finishing the season thirteenth in points, Casola got three top-10 finishes as well as two top-5's, which were a fifth at Gateway and a third at Talladega.

For the 2008 season, he joined Win-Tron Racing to drive their No. 32 Dodge part-time, sharing this car with Andy Hanson, Chris Wimmer, James Buescher, Matt Merrell, and Bradley Riethmeyer. He ran the first six races of the season, before then only competing in both races at his home track of Pocono as well as Berlin. He earned his first top-10 of the season at the first of the two Pocono races.

In 2010, Casola made his debut in the NASCAR Camping World Truck Series, driving the No. 00 Chevrolet Silverado for Daisy Ramirez Motorsports at Talladega. Since he was a late entry for the race, he received zero points. This was his only start in any NASCAR series that year. He started 35th and finished 28th in the race.

Casola did not race in any series in 2011, and believed that his career was over at that point. However, in August 2012, driver Roger Carter, owner of the Carter 2 Motorsports team in the ARCA Series, called Casola to drive for his team when the normal driver of his car (Larry Barford Jr.) parted ways with them and he needed a new driver. His first and only race for C2M that year came at the dirt race at Springfield, where he started and finished 26th in the No. 04 Dodge. He returned to the team in the No. 40 for a part-time schedule in 2013, splitting time in that car with Galen Hassler, Nick Tucker, Mark Meunier, Cody Lane, Korbin Forrister, Justin Lloyd, Joseph Hughs, and David Sear. Casola ran six races, which included both races at Pocono again as well as his other home track of New Jersey Motorsports Park. His best finish was a 16th at Chicago. The other two races he ran were Road America and DuQuoin. On top of that, he returned to the Truck Series that year in their race at Pocono, driving the No. 28 for FDNY Racing.

Although he has not made any stock-car starts since the 2013 season, Casola, as recently as 2018, continues to occasionally compete in local late model races, including at Wall Stadium, according to his Facebook page.

Motorsports career results

NASCAR
(key) (Bold – Pole position awarded by qualifying time. Italics – Pole position earned by points standings or practice time. * – Most laps led.)

Nationwide Series

 Season still in progress
 Ineligible for series points

Camping World Truck Series

Camping World East Series

ARCA Racing Series
(key) (Bold – Pole position awarded by qualifying time. Italics – Pole position earned by points standings or practice time. * – Most laps led.)

References

External links
 

1987 births
NASCAR drivers
ARCA Menards Series drivers
Living people
Racing drivers from New Jersey
People from Holmdel Township, New Jersey
CARS Tour drivers